Stanley Bernard Livingston (born November 24, 1950) is an American actor, director, producer, editor and writer.

Biography 

He is best known for playing Richard "Chip" Douglas, the third son of Steve Douglas (Fred MacMurray) on the television series My Three Sons. He and MacMurray were the only actors in the cast who appeared throughout the entire series. Stanley's own younger brother Barry played his adopted brother "Ernie" in later seasons.

Stanley and Barry Livingston were born in Los Angeles, California. Later in his career, before retiring, Stanley was a producer and director in Los Angeles.

Select filmography

Actor

The Bonnie Parker Story (1958).... Little Boy
Rally 'Round the Flag, Boys! (1958).... Peter Bannerman
The Adventures of Ozzie & Harriet (1958–1963) .... Stanley/Small Boy
Skippy (1958) ... Skippy
Please Don't Eat the Daisies (1960) .... Gabriel MacKay
My Three Sons .... Richard 'Chip' Douglas (1960–1972)
X-15 (1961) .... Mike Brandon
How the West Was Won (1962) ... Prescott Rawlings
Sarge - The Badge or the Cross (1971) (TV) .... Charlie
The Roman Holidays .... Happius Holiday (1972)
Private Parts (1972) .... Jeff
Room 222 (1 episode, 1973)
Devlin (1974) TV Series .... Additional Voices
Scooby-Doos (1974) TV Series .... Additional Voices
Lucas Tanner (1974) (TV) .... David Elrond
Attack of the 60 Foot Centerfold (1995) .... Glenn Manning
Stripteaser (1995)  .... Sneezer

As himself
This Is Your Life .... Himself (1 episode, 1961)
Yearbook: Class of 1967 (1985) (TV) .... Himself
TVLand Awards: A Celebration of Classic TV (2003) (TV) .... Himself
The O'Reilly Factor .... Himself (1 episode, February 2005)
TV Land Confidential .... Himself (4 episodes, 2005)
Living in TV Land .... Himself (1 episode, 2006)
On The Edge of Black and White .... Himself (Documentary, 2008)
The Early Show .... Himself (TV Series, 2009)
The Last Days of Cinerama .... Himself (Documentary, 2012)
Stu’s Show .... Himself (Documentary, 2022)

Director
Cory the Clown (2001 TV series; 20 episodes)
The Actor's Journey for Kids (Five-Part Documentary Series. TRT: 300 minutes, 2007)
The Actor's Journey (Eight-Part Documentary Series. TRT: 600 minutes, 2008)

Producer
The Actor's Journey Eight-Part Documentary Series. TRT: 600 minutes (2007)
The Actor's Journey for Kids (Five-Part Documentary Series TRT: 300 minutes, 2008)
In The Picture (2012 Cinerama film)
Checkers (2005 feature film)

Editor
Checkers (TRT: 83 minutes, 2005 feature film)

Special effects
Attack of the 60 Foot Centerfold (1995)

Writer
The Aftermath (1982; story)

Singer
 "Hairspray" b/w "Pen Pal" (Marilyn Records 03). Released in the fall of 1962 when Livingston was just eleven years old, "Hairspray" became a regional hit record in the radio publication The Gavin Report and was played at a handful of radio stations, such as KJOY in Stockton, California (where it climbed all the way to #2 in December) and at WMEX in Boston (where it made the top twenty). It was the only record Livingston ever released.

References

External links

1950 births
American male child actors
American male film actors
American male television actors
Living people
Male actors from Los Angeles